The Javan flameback (Chrysocolaptes strictus) is a species of bird in the family Picidae. It is found on Java, Bali and Kangean Islands.  It is sometimes considered a subspecies of the greater flameback.

References

Collar, N.J. 2011. Species limits in some Philippine birds including the Greater Flameback Chrysocolaptes lucidus. Forktail number 27: 29–38.

Javan flameback
Birds of Java
Javan flameback